Visagie's golden mole (Chrysochloris visagiei) is a small, insectivorous mammal of the family Chrysochloridae, the golden moles, endemic to South Africa.

References

Endemic fauna of South Africa
Afrosoricida
Mammals of South Africa
Mammals described in 1950
Species known from a single specimen